is a 1960 Japanese drama film directed by Kōzaburō Yoshimura, Kon Ichikawa and Yasuzo Masumura. It was entered into the 10th Berlin International Film Festival.

Plot
This is a series of three stories revolving around women. The first story is about a young woman who works in a Tokyo nightclub. She has what seems like a good plan for a strong financial future; she is investing in a company on the one hand, and on the other, taking action to snare the son of the company's owner in marriage. In the second story, a young woman is employed by a real estate agent in order to convince male clients to invest in worthless property, usually by bathing with them. The last story is about a widowed geisha who has no financial worries. But when she falls in love with a forger, she opts to wait for him after he is sent to prison. This causes trouble for her in family and society, but she ignores them despite the pressure.

Cast
Episode 1 (directed by Yasuzo Masumura)
 Ayako Wakao - Kimi
 Hiroshi Kawaguchi - Tabata
 Sachiko Hidari - Satsuki
 Jirō Tamiya - Harumoto
 Chieko Murata - Otatsu
Episode 2 (directed by Kon Ichikawa)
 Fujiko Yamamoto - Tsuneko
 Eiji Funakoshi - Yasushi
 Hitomi Nozoe - Girl
Episode 3 (directed by Kōzaburō Yoshimura)
 Machiko Kyō - Omitsu
 Nakamura Ganjirō II - Gosuke
 Junko Kano - Yumiko
 Jun Negishi - Kanemitsu

References

External links

1960 films
1960 drama films
Films directed by Kon Ichikawa
Films directed by Kōzaburō Yoshimura
Films directed by Yasuzo Masumura
1960s Japanese-language films
Daiei Film films
Films produced by Masaichi Nagata
Japanese drama films
1960s Japanese films